Hector Edwards Gray (18 November 1885 – 8 March 1957) was a New Zealand jockey and horse trainer. He was born in Albert Town, Central Otago, New Zealand on 18 November 1885.

See also

 Thoroughbred racing in New Zealand

References

1885 births
1957 deaths
People from Otago
New Zealand jockeys
New Zealand Racing Hall of Fame inductees